John Norman MacLeod (3 August 1788 – 25 March 1835) was a British politician who sat in the House of Commons from 1828 to 1830. He was the 24th Chief of Clan MacLeod.

John was born in India, the son of Major-General Norman MacLeod of MacLeod, 23rd Chief of Clan MacLeod. He married Anne Stevenson and had nine children.

In 1828, John was elected at a by-election as a Member of Parliament (MP) for Sudbury and held the seat until 1830.

He died in 1835 and was buried at Old Kilmuir Cem, Dunvegan, Skye, Scotland. His son, Norman MacLeod of MacLeod, succeeded him as the 25th Chief of Clan MacLeod.

Ancestry

References

1788 births
1835 deaths
John MacLeod
UK MPs 1826–1830
Members of the Parliament of the United Kingdom for English constituencies
MacLeod, John Norman MacLeod, 3rd Lord
19th-century British businesspeople